Smiling Irish Eyes (1929) is a Vitaphone American pre-Code musical film with Technicolor sequences. The film is now considered a lost film. However, the Vitaphone discs still exist.

Plot
Rory O'More leaves his sweetheart Kathleen O'Connor back in the old country while he travels to America to establish himself. He is a musician, and hopes to make it big. Kathleen grows tired of waiting and travels to America, only to find him on stage performing "their" song and kissing another woman. Kathleen returns to Ireland, followed by Rory, who explains everything. In the end they wed and return to America.

Cast

Colleen Moore as Kathleen O'Connor
James Hall as Rory O'More
Robert Homans as Shamus O'Connor
Claude Gillingwater as Michael O'Connor
Tom O'Brien as Black Barney
Robert Emmett O'Connor as Sir Timothy
Aggie Herring as Granny O'More
Betty Francisco as Frankie West
Julanne Johnston as Goldie Devore
Edward Earle - Ralph Prescott
Fred Kelsey as County Fair Manager
Barney Gilmore as County Fair Manager's Assistant
Charles McHugh as County Fair Manager's Assistant
Madam Bosocki as Fortune Teller
George 'Gabby' Hayes as Taxi Driver 
Anne Schaefer - Landlady 
John Beck as Sir Timothy's Butler
Oscar Apfel as Max North
Otto Lederer as Izzy Levi
William H. Strauss as Moe Levi
David Thursby as Scotch Barker
Dan Crimmins as The Trouble Maker

Background
Smiling Irish Eyes was Colleen Moore's first musical role, and only her second sound film. Produced by her husband at the time, John McCormick (1893-1961), the film featured Moore as Kathleen O'Connor, an Irish woman who follows her musician sweetheart Rory O'More (James Hall) to New York City.

This film is similar to an earlier film Moore made for Samuel Goldwyn, Come On Over (1922), directed by Rupert Hughes. As in Smiling Irish Eyes, Colleen played an Irish girl whose betrothed crosses the ocean to start a new life in America before sending for her. In both films, the boyfriends do not send for her right away, in both she travels to America only to find the boyfriend seemingly besotted by another girl. In both, cases this is a misunderstanding. In Come On Over, Colleen's character reluctantly remains in America where she learns that her boyfriend is actually helping the father of the "other woman" quit drinking. In Smiling Irish Eyes, Colleen's character returns to Ireland, followed by the boyfriend, who convinces her back in Ireland that it was a misunderstanding. They marry and return to America.
Following this film, Moore made another film directed by Seiter, Footlights and Fools (1929). This latter film also had Technicolor sequences, and is now considered a lost film, although the Vitaphone discs survive.

Soundtrack
 "Old Killarney Fair"
by Herman Ruby and Norman Spencer
Sung by Colleen Moore
 "Then I'll Ride Home with You"
by Herman Ruby and Norman Spencer
Sung by Colleen Moore
 "A Wee Bit o' Love"
by Herman Ruby and Norman Spencer
Sung by Coleen Moore
 "Smiling Irish Eyes"
by Herman Ruby and Ray Perkins
Sung by Colleen Moore and James Hall

See also
List of lost films
List of early color feature films

References
Jeff Codori (2012), Colleen Moore; A Biography of the Silent Film Star, McFarland Publishing,(Print , EBook ).

External links
Smiling Irish Eyes at Irish Film & TV Research Online

Smiling Irish Eyes at SilentEra
Smiling Irish Eyes at Answers.com

1929 films
1920s color films
1929 lost films
Lost American films
1929 musical films
Films directed by William A. Seiter
First National Pictures films
Films set in Ireland
American black-and-white films
Films scored by Louis Silvers
American musical films
Lost musical films
1920s American films